The Oregon, Pacific and Eastern Railway  was an Oregon-based short line railroad that began near Eugene as the Oregon and Southeastern Railroad (O&SE) in 1904. O&SE's line ran  along the Row River between the towns of Cottage Grove and Disston. The Oregon, Pacific & Eastern Railway Company incorporated in 1912, purchased the physical assets of the O&SE two years later, and shortened their total trackage to operate  from an interchange yard with the Southern Pacific Railroad at Cottage Grove, east to a 528' x 156' turnaround loop at Culp Creek. The last of this track was closed and scrapped in 1994, and ownership of its abandoned right of way property was later reverted to the state of Oregon to become one of the first-ever Government/Private Sector cooperative partnership Rails to Trails programs in the US, forming the Row River National Recreation Trail. A successor corporation now operates a narrow-gauge line at Wildlife Safari.

History

Industrial origins
The O&SE (locally known as the Old, Slow & Easy) was built to serve the gold, silver, copper, zinc, and lead mines in the Bohemia mining district of Mid-Coastal Oregon's Willamette River Valley. Sawmills were built along the route as soon as transportation was available for the lumber they would produce, but traffic was seldom sufficient to encourage investment in new equipment. Covered bridges were built at Walden, Currin, and Wildwood to prevent rot after a train fell through the wooden bridge into the inland Row River on 5 June 1909, at Currin.

In 1912, J.H. Chambers Lumber Company was a major investor when the line was reorganized as the OP&E. The OP&E built a  logging branch from Disston up Layng Creek in 1914, and in 1917, Chambers' Lumber company secured complete control of OP&E. As an economy move, Chambers built a gasoline-powered railbus to replace the daily passenger train. This "Galloping Goose" began operation on 1 April 1917 and remained the only passenger service until replaced by a thrice weekly mixed train under different ownership in March, 1929.

Post-WWI, silver screen stardom, and the Great Depression
The Anderson-Middleton Lumber Company purchased OP&E from Chambers in 1924, and built a new sawmill (today's Weyerhauser), south of Cottage Grove. The logging branch up Layng Creek was dismantled, and the rail relaid to form a new branch up to Herman Creek. Locomotive #8 and a trainload of logs fell through Walden bridge into Mosby Creek on 5 September 1924, killing both the engineer, and brakeman.

In 1925, Buster Keaton used the railway for his 1926 silent film classic The General. OP&E locomotives played the parts of #3 General, #5 Texas, and a Union Army locomotive pulling "Civil War coaches" (former Pacific Electric street cars specifically rebuilt for the film by the movie company). Local National Guard soldiers were hired to wear Civil War uniforms, and filming battle scenes caused several fires including one that destroyed the Red Bridge Station. The most exciting fire was the intentional destruction of Texas scene, on a bridge the movie company built over the Row River, filming of which was scheduled on July 4 for the enjoyment of local spectators, and resulted in a rousing success.

Anderson-Middleton Lumber Company went bankrupt in 1930, and OP&E struggled through the Great Depression with only 7 employees until increasing lumber demand finally caused sawmills to resume operations in the late 1930s. The company reorganized under the same name in 1940, and resumed daily service. The "Texas" Locomotive #5 would remain in the Row River until the Japanese' military preparations in 1941 raised the price of scrap iron just before World War II.

Post WWII, more film fame, abandonment, and reclamation

The Wildwood covered bridge was replaced with a steel girder span in 1948, and the other two covered bridges were similarly replaced in 1950, as Booth-Kelly Lumber Company built a  logging branch up Mosby Creek and also purchased OP&E. Rails were removed from the track east of Culp Creek in 1954 after two sawmills in Disston ceased operations. After steam-powered excursion trains were run 18–19 July 1959 to celebrate the Oregon Centennial, Georgia-Pacific purchased Booth-Kelly (including OP&E) in 1959.

Georgia-Pacific sold OP&E in 1970 to Willis B. Kyle, who formed the Row River Investment Company (jointly owned by Kyle Railroad predecessor Kyle Railways and Bohemia, Inc.). The line operated passenger excursions from 1972 until 1987. During these years, the railroad used a 1st generation self-propelled Budd Rail Diesel Car ('RDC-1'), originally built for Southern Pacific, which had spent most of its life as #10 on Southern Pacific's subsidiary Northwestern Pacific. On OP&E it was known as "The Goose".

During the Summer of 1972, 20th Century Fox's 1973 motion picture Emperor of the North Pole, starring Lee Marvin, Ernest Borgnine, Keith Carradine, (and also including Vic Tayback, Charles Tyner, Simon Oakland, Elisha Cook Jr., Liam Dunn, & Matt Clark) was filmed along the railroad's right-of-way using some of the company's equipment, including Kyle's 1915-built 90 ton Baldwin (serial number 42000) 2-8-2 logging steam locomotive No. 19. The film was released on DVD as Emperor of the North in 2006. In 1985, Stand By Me, Rob Reiner's motion picture of a Stephen King novelette, was also filmed along the railroad's right of way.

In March 1986, the company owned a total of three locomotives, 31 boxcars, and 44 flatcars. All of that fleet is gone, except for an old GE 44-ton switcher.

Bohemia Incorporated bought out the railroad in Cottage Grove from Kyle in 1987. Kyle's 1915 Baldwin 2-8-2 locomotive No. 19 was returned to the Yreka Western Railroad (another Kyle owned railroad) in California that same year. In 1994, Bohemia discontinued service along the entire 17 mile OP&E line, the Oregon Pacific & Eastern Railway was dissolved as a corporation on December 19, 1994., the line was then abandoned, taken up as scrap, and the right of way and easements transformed into a hiking and bicycling nature preserve, the Row River National Recreation Trail.

The "new" OP&E railway
The Oregon Pacific & Eastern came back to life and was incorporated as an Oregon corporation in 2001 by Robert W. Larson. Larson is a long-time consultant to Kyle and a former employee of the OP&E from Roseburg, Oregon. Larson is now the president and CEO of the new OP&E. Currently Larson owns a GE 44-ton locomotive that will have the original OP&E reporting marks added. Larson worked with Athearn to produce HO and N scale models of OP&E and Yreka Western boxcars. Bowser/Stewart Hobbies also made an unauthorized version of a 50-foot 2- and 4-door tapered-roof HO scale model auto-boxcar.

In March 2007, the OP&E took over as a concession operator of a narrow gauge railroad operation at Wildlife Safari in Winston, Oregon. Larson also owns the LP&N (Longview, Portland & Northern Railway) in Gardiner, Oregon.

Locomotives

Gallery

References

External links

Defunct Oregon railroads
Transportation in Lane County, Oregon
1904 establishments in Oregon